Filmography for the Indo-Chinese Hong Kong film actor and martial artist Lo Lieh:

Wan hua ying chun (1964) - Extra in nightclub (uncredited)
Hu die bei (1965) - General Shih
Temple of the Red Lotus (1965) - Tu Chuang
The Twin Swords (1965) - Tu Chuang
Tiger Boy (1966) - Chin Peng
The Magnificent Trio (1966) - Yen Tzu-ching
The Sword and the Lute (1967) - Tu Ying
The Thundering Sword (1967) - Cheng Kun-yuen
Ru xia (1967) - Han General (Guest star)
Trapeze Girl (1967) - Liu Yao-wu
King Cat (1967) - Hua Chung
One-Armed Swordsman (1967) - Master Wan / The Fox
Golden Swallow (1968) - Iron Whip Han Tao
The Singing Thief (1969) - Wang Guo Ji
Twelve Deadly Coins (1969) - Chiao Mao
Dragon Swamp (1969) - Yu Jiang
The Flying Dagger (1969) - Yang Ching
The Invincible Fist (1969) - Tieh Wu-ching
Brothers Five (1970) - Kao Hsia - 5th brother
Valley of the Fangs (1970)
Swordswomen Three (1970) - Chu Tien Hsiang
The Chinese Boxer (1970) - Kitashima
Duel for Gold (1971) - 'Lone Shadow' Teng Chi Yan
The Rescue (1971) - Lo Ho-wu
Wan jian chuan xin (1971) - Chin Liang
Xia shi hang (1971) - Fan Yi
The Swift Knight (1971) - Lei Yu Feng
The Lady Hermit (1971) - Wu Chang-chun
The Lizard (1972)
King Boxer (1972) - Chao Chih-Hao
The 14 Amazons (1972) - 5th Prince
Trilogy of Swordsmanship (1972) - Pang Xun
The Fugitive (1972)
Niu gui she shen (1973)
Xiang Gang shi de tou qing (1973)
Kiss of Death (1973) - Wong Ta
Devil and Angel (1973, Director) - Tong-Sen
Supermen Against the Orient (1973) - Master Tang
The Bamboo House of Dolls (1973) - Tsui Kuo-Tung
Qing Kung (1973)
Nu ji zhong ying (1973) - Tsui Kuo-Tung
Long hu hui feng yun (1973) - Fan Tien-hu
Wei ji si fu (1974)
Heung gong chat sup sam (1974) - Reception desk policeman
La Brute Le Colt et Karate (Blood Money) (1974)    *Kidnap (1974) - Lung Wei
Concrete Jungle (1974) - ? (scenes deleted)
Tian wang (1974) - Lung Wei
Xiao hai yu gou, Ai (1974)
Mistery in Hongkong (1974)
Jin sha shou (1974)
The Stranger and the Gunfighter (1974) - Ho Chiang
Five Shaolin Masters (1974)
Night of the Devil's Bride (1975) - Kao Tien
A Debt of Crime (1975)
Gambling Syndicate (1975) - Prison Warden (Guest star)
Lady of the Law (1975)
Black Magic (1975) - Lang Jiajie
Jin san jiao (1975) - Tony Wong
Biao qi fei yang (1975) - Ling Hsiao
Fists of Dragons (1975)
Xiang gang qi an (1976) - Chen Chung (Part 3)
Fierce Fist (1976) - Ku Shun
Wanglyong (1976) - Wangryang
Killer Clans (1976) - Han Tang
The Dragon Missile (1976) - Szema Chun
Gugje gyeonchal (1976)
The Magic Blade (1976) - Yen Nan-fei
The Web of Death (1976) - Snake unit chief, Lu Shen
Black Magic 2 (1976) - Kang Cong
Invisible Terrorist (1976)
The Big Boss Part II (1976) - Cheng Chao-Chun
One Armed Swordsman Against Nine Killers (1976) - Shao Si Yu 
Bruce's Deadly Fingers (1976)
Seven Men of Kung Fu (1976)
Dirty Ho (1976) - General Liang
Knife of Devil's Roaring and Soul Missing (1976)
Super Dragon (1976)
Men of the Hour (1977)
Long Wei shan zhuang (1977) - Sung Cheng-hsi
Executioners from Shaolin (1977) - The White-Browed Hermit
Shui ling long (1977)
Jade Tiger (1977) - Tang Chueh
The Face Behind The Mask (1977) - Leng Yen-ching
Killer from Above (1977)
Return of Bruce (1977) - Sakata Chiro's Brother
The Chivalry Gunman and Killer (1977)
Death Duel (1977) - Hero Huang Ting
Invincible Swordswoman (1977)
Fist of Fury II (1977) - Miyamoto
Qing tian jian piao xiang (1977) - Tung-Fang Ming-Liang
Zheng He xia xi yang (1977)
Ren ba zhao (1977)
Wanglyong 2 (1977)
The Damned (1977) - Pao Cheng-fang
Pursuit of Vengeance (1977)
Great Chase (1977)
18 Swirling Riders (1977) - Master Mui
Wu xing ba quan (1977)
Tiger Love (1977)
Long quan xiao zi (1977)
Ji tian jian piao xiang (1977)
Jiang Nan ba da xia (1977)
Hei dai kong shou dao (1977)
Guan dong wu ta xia (1977) - Mr. Cher
Da wu shi yu xiao piao ke (1977)
Prominent Eunuch Chen Ho (1977)
Heroes of Shaolin (1977)
Greatest Plot (1977) - Marshal Nien
Showdown at the Equator (1978)
Flying Guillotine Part 2 (1978) - Suen Pao-ying
The 36th Chamber of Shaolin (1978) - General Tien Ta
Vengeful Beauty (1978) - Chin Kang-Feng / Guillotine squad leader
Shaolin Handlock (1978) - Ling Hao
Immortal Warriors (1978)
Murder of Murders (1978) - Ran Chen Feng
Heaven Sword and Dragon Sabre (1978) - Xie Xun, the Golden Hair Lion King
Yi tian tu long ji da jie ju (1978)
Little Hero (1978)
Daesaboo (1978)
Chilhyeobpalui (1978)
Solimsa Mok-ryeon dosa (1978)
Tong tian lao shu xia jiang nan (1978)
Born Invincible (1978) - Ku Yu Tieh
Zodiac Fighters (1978)
Qi xia ba yi (1978)
Manhunt (1978) - Mongol commander
My Blade, My Life (1978)
Three Shaolin Musketeers (1978)
Red Phoenix (1978) - Ku Chuan
Revenge of the Shaolin Kid (1978) - Kim Man-kang
The Cavalier (1978) - War Minister Kung
Fatal Needles vs. Fatal Fists (1978) - Captain Chow Lung
Lung Wei Village (1978) - Zeng Canghai
Fists of Bruce Lee (1978)
The Swift Shaolin Boxer (1978)
The Idiot Swordsman (1979)
Du jiao he (1979)
The Reckless Cricket (1979) - Old Man
Ge shi ge fa (1979)
Murder Plot (1979) - Ge-hsi Wang
Abbot of Shaolin (1979) - Pai Mei
Scorching Sun, Fierce Winds, Wild Fire (1979) - Ta Fu
Young Dragon (1979)
Shou kou (1979)
Mad Monkey Kung Fu (1979) - Tuan
Black Belt Karate (1979) - Japanese Karate Expert
The Eighteen Jade Arhats (1979) - Ku Ying-Pong
Fists and Guts (1979) - Housekeeper / Tibetan Monk
Ape Girl (1979)
Green Dragon Inn (1979)
Shen bu (1979) - Liu Te-kao
Eunuch of the Western Palace (1979)
Drunken Arts and Crippled Fist (1979)
Clan Of The White Lotus (1980, Director) - Priest White Lotus
Swift Sword (1980)
Rendezvous with Death (1980) - Beggar Yang Fung
Dangerous Encounter of the 1st Kind (1980) - Tan
Jade Fox (1980)
Emperor of Shaolin Kung Fu (1980) - Liang
Secret of Chinese Kung Fu (1980)
Return of the Sentimental Swordsman (1981) - Hu Bu-Kuei
Return of the Deadly Blade (1981)
Revenge of the Corpse (1981)
The Story of Woo Viet (1981) - Sarm
Emperor and His Brother (1981) - Zhao Zhao-zhong
Tong jun le (1981)
Notorious Eight (1981) - Hu Kuan Tien
Dangerous Person (1981) - 7th Uncle
Ninja Pirates (1981)
Ninja Supremo (1981)
What Price Honesty? (1981)
Winner Takes All (1982)
Kung Fu from beyond the Grave (1982) - Kam Tai Fu
Long tou lao da (1982)
The Lawman (1982)
Perils of the Sentimental Swordsman (1982)
The Spirit of the Sword (1982) - Fire Clan chief
Human Lanterns (1982) - Chao Chun-Fang
Buddha's Palm (1982) - Pi Gu
Flash Legs (1982) - Scarred Dragon
Mercenaries from Hong Kong (1982) - Lei Tai
Eagle's Claw and Butterfly Palm (1982) - Chek / Butterfly Clan Prince
The Enchantress (1983) - Master Ku
Ghosts Galore (1983) - Magician Lien
The Black Magic with Buddha (1983, Director) - Sorcerer
Hong Kong, Hong Kong (1983)
The Hidden Power of the Dragon Sabre (1983)
Little Dragon Maiden (1983)
Deadly Kick (1983, Director)
Family Light Affair (1984) - Ping
Return of Bastard Swordsman (1984) - Ghost Doctor Lan Xin Zu
Secret Service of the Imperial Court (1984)
The Occupant (1984) - Mr. Chan
I will Finally Knock You Down, Dad (1984) - Father of the Bride
Crazy Shaolin Disciple (1985) - Chef Chih Lien-Chia
Chao ling chu nan (1985)
Mo deng shen tan (1985)
How to Choose a Royal Bride (1985) - Nalan Xiu Ji
Let Us Flirt, Partner (1985, Writer / Director only)
Oh, My God (1985) - Inspector Lui / Superman
Zen Master 6 (1987, Producer / Director only)
Dragons Forever (1988) - Triad Gangster Boss (uncredited)
On the Run (1988) - Hsi
City War (1988) - Uncle Kuen
Lóng quán mì gông (1988)
Edge of Darkness (1988) - Choi
Miracles (1989) - Fei
Seven Warriors (1989) - Piu
Bin yuen sui yuet (1989) - Tai
Just Heroes (1989) - Law
Life Is Cheap... But Toilet Paper Is Expensive (1989) - Pianist
The Truth Final Episode (1989)
Ghost Ballroom (1989) - Mr. Lo
Path of Glory (1989) - Big Mouth Wa
A Fiery Family (1989) - Law Chung Lit
Fatal Passion (1990)
Luan shi er nu (1990) - Pai
Return to Action (1990)
Miao jie huang hou (1990) - Elvis
Wu ming jia zu (1990) - Triad Boss
In the Line of Duty 5: Middle Man (1990) - Alan's Godfather
Tiger Cage 2 (1990) - Uncle Chiu
Forsaken Cop (1990)
Blood Stained Tradewinds (1990)
Bullet for Hire (1990) - Ngok
Bo Hao (1991) - Tin
Ng foo cheung: Kuet lit (1991) - Chiu Chow
Chung gik tin ji moon sang (1991) - Sam
Sex and Zen (1991) - Choi Kun-Lun
Hei xing feng yun (1991) - Boss
Police Story 3: Super Cop (1992) - The General
Wu hu si hai (1992) - Chi
Qi an shi lu bai se tong dao (1992)
Du wang zhi zun (1992) - Low
Shen Jing Dao yu Fei Tian Mao(1993) - Sudden Death
Yuk fung (1993) - Kwan
Sheng gang da zhui ji (1993) - Inspector Bai
Huo zhong (1993) - Tiger Wan
Zui sang mung sei: Wan Chai ji foo (1994) - Kui
Hei se zou lang (1994)
Hubungan jenayah (1995)
Fist of Fury (1995, TV Series)
ei yan bong: Chin ng gau sai (1999) - Mo's Dad
Glass Tears (2001) - Wu
The Vampire Combat (2001) - Wei Tung's Uncle (final film role)

External links
Lo Lieh
Filmography

Cinema of Hong Kong
Lieh